False Idols is the ninth studio album by English trip hop musician Tricky, released on 23 May 2013. It is Tricky's first release on his label False Idols, an imprint of !K7.

The album features guest vocals by Francesca Belmonte, Fifi Rong, Nneka and Peter Silberman of The Antlers. The song "Nothing's Changed", which features Francesca Belmonte, was released on 27 February 2013. A music video for "Does It" premiered on 27 March 2013.

Tricky compared False Idols to his debut album, Maxinquaye, concluding that "False Idols is a better album." He also stated that "False Idols was about him finding himself again."

In support of the album, Tricky was to embark on a ten-date US tour, which would have kicked off in Columbus, Ohio on 8 June 2013. However, he was forced to postpone the tour until October due to unforeseen US visa issues. In 2014 it was awarded a double silver certification from the Independent Music Companies Association, which indicated sales of at least 40,000 copies throughout Europe.

Track listing

Sample credits
 "Valentine" contains excerpts from "My Funny Valentine" as performed by Chet Baker.
 "Does It" features a sample from "Love Is a Chainstore" by The Ropes.
 "Hey Love" contains elements from "Ghosts" by Japan.

Personnel
Credits for False Idols adapted from liner notes.

 Tricky – production (all tracks); vocals (3, 4, 6, 8, 12–15); additional vocals (5); photography
 The Antlers – guitar, lead vocals, production (5)
 Chet Baker – vocals (3)
 Francesca Belmont – vocals (1, 3, 4, 6, 8–10, 12, 13)
 Pepe Belmonte – guitar (4, 10)
 Ian Caple – mixing

 Tristan Cassell – vocals (9)
 John Davis – mastering
 Lee Jaffe – harmonica (2)
 François Kerjan – engineering
 Nneka – vocals (2)
 Anna Aiko Roche – artwork
 Fifi Rong – vocals (7, 11); production (11)

Charts

Release history

References

2013 albums
Tricky (musician) albums